The Mindanao shrew (Crocidura beatus) is a species of mammal in the family Soricidae. It is endemic to the Philippines.  Its natural habitat is subtropical or tropical dry forests.

Sources

Crocidura
Mammals of the Philippines
Endemic fauna of the Philippines
Fauna of Mindanao
Fauna of Bohol
Fauna of Leyte
Fauna of Biliran
Fauna of Camiguin
Mammals described in 1910
Taxonomy articles created by Polbot